The Lucala River is a river in Angola, a right tributary of Angola's largest river, the Cuanza River.

The Lucala has its source in Uíge Province, runs through Malanje Province, where it feeds the Kalandula Falls, and finally empties into the Cuanza River near Massangano in Cuanza Norte Province, some kilometers downstream of Dondo.

Rivers of Angola